Yoshifumi Ato (born May 2, 1983) is a Japanese musician, bandleader, composer, and record producer, based in Tokyo. His record production credits include artists such as Harumi Tsuyuzaki, Skoop On Somebody, Lena Fujii, HKT48, M-Swift, Fox Capture Plan, Jabberloop, Soulhead, and Coldfeet. He has led the Japanese electropop band Autumn Leave's since 2000. He is also known as a frontman and composer of Japanese musical project Miu-clips.
As a composer, his musical piece is played by many TV programs and CMs of Japan, China, Vietnam, Hawaii, England, Spain, France (Honda, Bridgestone, Dentsu, Casio, Kirin Company, Yahoo etc.).

External links
miu-clips Official website
Nippon Columbia | miu-clips

1983 births
Bandleaders
Japanese composers
Japanese male composers
Japanese male musicians
Japanese record producers
Living people